In the 1946–47 Hungarian League, Újpesti TE won the championship.

Final standings

Results

Statistical leaders

Top goalscorers

References

Nemzeti Bajnokság I seasons
Hun
1946–47 in Hungarian football